Septemtrionalis may refer to:

Senna septemtrionalis, the arsenic bush
Tritonia septemtrionalis, a species of dendronotid nudibranch